The Wisconsin Blast was an American professional basketball club based in Appleton, Wisconsin that competed in the International Basketball Association (IBA) beginning in the 1997–98 season. The team folded after the 1998–99 season. Pat Knight was the head coach of the Blast and Jon Stuckey was his assistant coach. Knight also served as the team's general manager. Keary Ecklund owned the Blast. Ira Newble, who later played in the NBA for several seasons, was perhaps their best known player.

References

Defunct basketball teams in the United States
Basketball teams in Wisconsin
1997 establishments in Wisconsin
1999 disestablishments in Wisconsin
Basketball teams established in 1997
Basketball teams disestablished in 1999
Sports in Appleton, Wisconsin